Kom Vo is a populated place situated in Pima County, Arizona, United States. The name is derived from the Tohono O'odham ko:m wo'o, meaning "hackberry pond". Historically, it has also been known by Comeva, Comova, and Comovo, which are all variants with the same meaning.

References

Populated places in Pima County, Arizona